Pat Kwok Wai (born 11 January 1970) is a Hong Kong sprinter. He competed in the men's 200 metres at the 1992 Summer Olympics. Pat later became an athletics coach. He married fellow sprinter Wan Kin Yee in 2002.

References

External links
 

1970 births
Living people
Athletes (track and field) at the 1992 Summer Olympics
Hong Kong male sprinters
Hong Kong sports coaches
Olympic athletes of Hong Kong
Place of birth missing (living people)